Guy Drut (born 6 December 1950) is an Olympic champion and politician who won gold at the 1976 Summer Olympics in Montreal in the 110 m hurdles. In 1996, he became a member of the International Olympic Committee (IOC).

Biography

Sports career
Born in Oignies, Pas-de-Calais, France, Drut captured the silver medal in the 1972 Summer Olympics in Munich, finishing behind the American Rod Milburn. In the European Championship of 1974 Drut came a comfortable first. It was at the next Olympics that Guy was to realise his dream, winning the 110 m hurdles in a time of 13.30 ahead of Cuba's Alejandro Casañas and the American Willie Davenport.

Political career
After retirement Guy became active in business and politics, with one of his roles being Minister of Youth Affairs and Sports in the conservative government of Alain Juppé from 1995 to 1997. He has been convicted by French courts (a 15-month suspended prison sentence) at the end of 2005 for accepting fictitious employment as political patronage; as a consequence suspended by the IOC. In 2006, president Jacques Chirac amnestied Drut, using a rarely used clause in a 2002 amnesty law authorizing the president to grant amnesty for certain categories of crimes to people who had made great contributions to France in certain fields.
The move caused great controversy, including within the majority members of Parliament: president of the National Assembly Jean-Louis Debré commented that it gave an unpleasant impression of "self-washing machine" but said it was a "courageous" move that he would not have made;
Nicolas Sarkozy, president of the majority party UMP, disapproved such uses of amnesty. 
Chirac justified it by France's regaining a seat at IOC.

Drut is serving on the IOC's Evaluation Commission for the 2016 Summer Olympics.

International competitions

1 Did not finish in the final

References

External links
 
 Amnesty law of 6 August 2002, article 10

1950 births
Living people
Sportspeople from Pas-de-Calais
Politicians of the French Fifth Republic
French male hurdlers
International Olympic Committee members
French sportsperson-politicians
Athletes (track and field) at the 1972 Summer Olympics
Athletes (track and field) at the 1976 Summer Olympics
Olympic athletes of France
Olympic gold medalists for France
Olympic silver medalists for France
Medalists at the 1972 Summer Olympics
Medalists at the 1976 Summer Olympics
European Athletics Championships medalists
Officers of the Ordre national du Mérite
European champions for France
Olympic gold medalists in athletics (track and field)
Olympic silver medalists in athletics (track and field)
Deputies of the 12th National Assembly of the French Fifth Republic
Mediterranean Games gold medalists for France
Mediterranean Games medalists in athletics
Athletes (track and field) at the 1971 Mediterranean Games